The brush-tailed mulgara (Dasycercus blythi), previously the mulgara Dasycercus cristicauda is a medium sized carnivorous Australian marsupial species weighing approximately . The brush-tailed mulgara is sexually dimorphic with males being much larger than females.

The taxonomy of the mulgaras has been confusing, but as of 2006, the species names were clarified as this species being Dasycercus blythi (previously D. cristicauda) and the crest-tailed mulgara (D. cristicauda) previously(D. hillieri) .

Physical appearance
Dasycercus blythi  is a medium sized, sexually dimorphic  carnivorous dasyurid. Female body mass is between 50 g and 90 g, with males weighing between 75 g and 120 g. The tail is “of moderate length, shorter than the head and body, incrassated in good seasons (thickened); the proximal two-fifths covered with short still yellow hairs, the remainder with gradually lengthening black hairs that do not however form a crest. The whole of the lower surface is black, with the exception of a small proximal portion which is yellow.”  The upper portion of fur appears sandy and speckled with brown, while the basal portion appears as a dark grey. The entirety of the under belly, inner side of the limbs, and lining of the pouch are pure white. Dentition shows two premolar teeth in both the upper and lower jaws, with the first observed as smaller than the second in the upper jaw. The most obvious feature that distinguishes D. blythi from  D. cristicauda is the sandy colour and the lack of a crest on the tail.

Habitat

D. blythi is widely distributed, having been observed during different expeditions in the north-western, central, and south-western areas of the arid zone of Australia.  While once widespread and common throughout the central deserts of Australia, a decline has been observed during the 1930s, resulting in a more fragmented distribution than previously observed.  Considering the sedentary behavior of D. blythi, their spinifex habitat is considered unusual, as it provides a less stable environment that is prone to things such as fire.

Diet

D. blythi is an opportunistic carnivorous marsupial eating a wide range of invertebrates, frogs, reptiles, and  small mammals. Beetles are one of the most common food sources. The dietary flexibility allows this species to persist and may assist individuals to occupy stable home ranges.

Population dynamics

Populations often occur as scattered with relatively low population densities while still being locally abundant. Populations of D. blythi are unique in that they are sedentary populations rather than highly mobile, something often observed in smaller dasyurid species, whose  movements can range up to several kilometers.  Populations decline consistently during the winter and spring, possibly due to decreased food during the winter season, reducing available food for potentially pregnant females that would need to feed their young, and reduction of available males due to aggressive competition for access to females earlier in the year.  Notably, dramatic increases in population can be observed after large rainfall events, which are thought to come from D. blythi'''s competition with small rodent population explosions following such events.  Young female mothers have been observed to remain near the location of their birth, while young males often spread out, reducing competition for food, increasing opportunities to breed, and avoid potential inbreeding.  Once males find a home range, they become sedentary due to increased fitness by remaining in a familiar area rather than moving to new, uncharted territory.

ReproductionD. blythi breeds seasonally, producing only one litter a year with litters reproducing the year following their birth.  This reproductive strategy is different from that of other dasyurids, which often birth multiple litters a year to balance unpredictable reproductive conditions.  Their monoestry is thought to arise from increased access to larger and more reliably available prey, such as small mammals and reptiles, which are inaccessible by smaller dasyurids.  Unlike other dasyurids, males do not die after breeding."Mulgara." Australian Wildlife Conservancy, n.d. Web. 02 Dec. 2013.  Studies suggest that the onset of breeding occurs by the timing of the female oestrus, as males were observed to be in proper conditions to reproduce for about a month prior to the occurrence of breeding.  Gestation ranges from 30 to 48 days, being extended by factors such as scarce food resources, low temperatures, and frequency of torpor. After birth, the young suckle between 12 and 15 weeks by hanging below the female's body due to a reduced pouch, a pair of lateral flaps.  A maximum of six young have been found in the pouches of collected specimens.  The sex ratio in litters is 1:1, and while offspring may survive more than one mating season, only a small proportion of the population survives into a third year.  In captivity, up to a five-year lifespan has been observed.

BehaviorD. blythi digs deep burrows, providing protection from the extremes of climate and potentially the predation by introduced European species to which other small and medium-sized desert mammals often fall prey.  Burrows have been observed to be about 0.5 m deep and generally occupied by a single individual outside the breeding season.  Certain populations have about half of the burrows used by an individual only once, while others were used over long periods of time, repeatedly.

Torpor is often employed by D. blythi, entering torpor at night until midday.  This practice is not abandoned during reproduction even with the associated energy costs.  Its benefit is felt both in summer and winter seasons, as it allows for reduction of endogenous heat production and maintenance of energy spent to be below basal metabolic rate.

Conservation status

Numbers within the D. blythi population fluctuate greatly in accordance with climate conditions, which make population estimates difficult to establish, thus creating difficulty in tracking population trends.  The cause of decline in the D. blythi'' population is unknown, and threatening processes have not been able to be confirmed; potential threats include changes in fire regimens, grazing by introduced herbivores such as cattle and rabbits, and predation by introduced predators from European settlement.  Another hypothesis is that environmental damage has had a negative impact on the mulgara population.  To provide further protection and future proliferation, animal surveys using targeted trapping and patch burning programs are used to create an ideal habitat.  Fire does not have a negative impact on population as long as 15% cover is maintained.

Care for the mulgara habitat, especially with controlled burns, should employ a fire regime that burns a mosaic of land with no particular piece of land being burnt more often than once per three to five years.  This will provide a fire regime that leaves the necessary 15% cover intact for successful species proliferation.

The species is scheduled to be reintroduced to Dirk Hartog Island, following the complete removal of livestock and feral cats.

References

Dasyuromorphs
Mammals of Queensland
Mammals described in 1904